To Commit a Murder (France: Peau d'espion) is a 1967 French neo-noir spy film starring Louis Jourdan. It was one of a series of thrillers directed by Edouard Molinaro in the 1960s. The film was based on the 1967 novel Peau d'espion by Jacques Robert.

Plot
A playboy writer gets involved in a plot to kidnap a scientist and take him to Red China.

Cast
 Louis Jourdan: Charles Beaulieu
 Senta Berger: Gertraud
 Bernard Blier: maggiore Rhone
 Edmond O'Brien: Sphax
 Maurice Garrel: Black
 Fabrizio Capucci: Cecil
 Giuseppe Addobbati: Moranez
 Gamil Ratib: Belloum

References

External links

To Commit a Murder at TCMDB

1967 films
Neo-noir
French neo-noir films
1960s spy films
French spy films
Films directed by Édouard Molinaro
Cold War spy films
Films set in Heidelberg
Films set in West Germany
Films based on French novels
1960s French films